Bob Whalen (born October 15, 1957) is an American college baseball coach who has been the head coach of Dartmouth since the start of the 1990 season.  Under him, the Big Green have appeared in two NCAA Tournaments.  A Maine alumnus, Whalen worked as an assistant coach there from 1982 to 1989.

Playing career
Whalen played college baseball under head coach John Winkin at Maine from 1976 to 1979, appearing on the school's 1976 College World Series team.  His teammates at Maine included Red Sox coach Brian Butterfield, Clemson head coach Jack Leggett, and major leaguer Bert Roberge.

Coaching career

Assistant coaching
After working as a high school coach following graduation, Whalen began his college coaching career prior to the start of the 1982 season as an assistant at Maine.  He coached at Maine through the end of the 1989 season and was associate head coach for his final three seasons there.  During his tenure, Maine reached four College World Series.

While a Maine assistant, Whalen also worked as an American Legion baseball coach and was the head coach of the Cape Cod Baseball League's Chatham Anglers from 1988 to 1989.

Dartmouth
When Mike Walsh left Dartmouth in late 1989 to become the athletic director at Washington & Lee, the school hired Whalen to replace him.  Whalen said when he was hired, "I'm excited about it. I guess I feel here the way I first did when I went to Maine as an assistant. The only thing you can ask for is a chance."

In the 1990s, Dartmouth finished no higher than second in the Rolfe Division.  The team had three 20-win seasons (1990, 1997, 1998) but did not reach the postseason.  In this stretch, Whalen had two major award winners.  Brian Nickerson was named Ivy Rookie of the Year in 1997, and Greg Gilmer won the Blair Bat in 1994 as the league's leading hitter (.476).  Whalen also had three players selected in the MLB Draft.  Mark Johnson, a 20th-round selection of the Pirates in 1990, later played in Major League Baseball.

The Big Green had more success in the early 2000s, winning Rolfe Division titles in 2000, 2001, and 2004. In 2000, the team went 29–14 (17–3 Ivy), winning the division by six games over second-place Brown. In the Ivy Championship Series, however, it was swept by Gehrig Division champion Princeton. In 2001, the team shared the division title with Brown but defeated the Bears, 7–2, in a one-game playoff to advance to the championship series. The program hosted the series at Red Rolfe Field for the first time. There, it won its opener against Princeton, 6–5, but dropped consecutive games and lost the series. In 2004, Dartmouth went 25–17 (15–5 Ivy) and won the division outright but was again defeated by Princeton in the championship series.  Shortstop Ed Lucas, who was drafted in 2004, went on to play for the Miami Marlins.

When Maine head coach Paul Kostacopoulos left for Navy at the end of the 2005 season, Whalen was one of the finalists to replace him, but the school instead hired Manhattan head coach Steve Trimper.

In the late 2000s, Whalen oversaw extensive $5.2 million renovations to Red Rolfe Field at Biondi Park, Dartmouth's home venue. The renovations added an artificial turf surface, stadium seating, and a new electronic scoreboard, among other features.

After last place finishes in 2005 and 2007, Dartmouth was consistently the best program in the Rolfe Division in the late 2000s and early 2010s.  From 2008–2014, the Big Green won seven straight Rolfe Division titles.  Whalen received the NEIBA Coach of the Year award in 2008 and the Jack Butterfield Award in 2010.  The Big Green won the Ivy League Championship Series twice in this stretch, defeating Cornell in 2009 and Columbia in 2010, to advance to the NCAA Tournament.  As the four seed at the 2009 Chapel Hill Regional, Dartmouth went 0–2, losing games to host North Carolina and third-seeded Kansas.  As the four seed at the 2010 Coral Gables Regional, Dartmouth went 1–2; the team dropped its opener to host Miami (FL), then eliminated third-seeded FIU before being eliminated by Texas A&M.

In the first game of an April 21, 2014, doubleheader, Dartmouth defeated Brown, 7–0, to give Whalen his 500th career win. The Big Green's Michael Concato threw a four-hit shutout in the game.

From 2000 to 2014, 18 of Whalen's players have been selected in the Major League Baseball Draft.  The highest selections, eighth-rounders Ed Lucas and Kyle Hendricks, went on to appear in Major League Baseball.  In the same stretch, the program has had two Ivy Pitchers of the Year, three Players of the Year, and five Rookies of the Year.

Head coaching record

NCAA
Below is a table of Whalen's yearly records as a collegiate head baseball coach.

Collegiate summer
Below is a table of Whalen's records as a collegiate summer baseball head coach.

Personal
Whalen's father, Bob "Chick" Whalen, was the scouting director for the Pittsburgh Pirates. Chick died in 1993.

Whalen is renowned for his detailed practice plans and inventive bunt defense plays.

See also
 List of current NCAA Division I baseball coaches
 Dartmouth Big Green

References

Living people
1957 births
Sportspeople from Needham, Massachusetts
Baseball players from Massachusetts
Maine Black Bears baseball players
High school baseball coaches in the United States
Cape Cod Baseball League coaches
Maine Black Bears baseball coaches
Dartmouth Big Green baseball coaches